Autoba angulifera is a species of moth of the family Erebidae first described by Frederic Moore in 1882. It is found in India.

Biology
The larvae had been recorded on Mangifera sp. (Aiyar, 1943)

References

Boletobiinae
Moths of Asia
Moths described in 1882